Alexandro Cavagnera (born 1 December 1998) is a Belgian footballer of Italian descent who plays as a midfielder.

He signed with Milan in July 2018, although he spent the season on loan at Swiss club Lugano. He was released by Milan in September 2019.

References

Living people
1998 births
Belgian footballers
Association football midfielders
Standard Liège players
A.C. Milan players
Belgian Pro League players
Belgian people of Italian descent